Lake Alvin Recreation Area is a state recreation area in Lincoln County, South Dakota in the United States. The recreation area is popular for fishing, hiking, and swimming at Lake Alvin. It is approximately 13 miles southeast of Sioux Falls and just west of the Iowa border and the Big Sioux River.

See also
List of South Dakota state parks

References

External links
 Lake Alvin Recreation Area - South Dakota Department of Game, Fish, and Parks

Protected areas of Lincoln County, South Dakota
Protected areas of South Dakota
State parks of South Dakota